Nosipho Dorothy Ntwanambi (25 September 1959 – 8 July 2014) was a South African politician, as well as a women's and human rights activist.

Career
She was a member of the African National Congress (ANC), Ntwanambi was the ANC's Chief Whip in the National Council of Provinces, the first woman to become chief whip, a position she held until she stepped down in 2014. She served as a member of the National Council of Provinces, the upper house of the Parliament of South Africa, from 2008 until 2014. Ntwanambi was also serving as a deputy president of the African National Congress Women's League (ANCWL) at the time of her death.

Ntwanambi was a founding member of both the South African Democratic Teachers Union (SADTU) and the United Women's Organisation (UWO). She was also a member of the ANC's National Executive Committee.

Death
Nosipho Ntwanambi died following a long illness on Tuesday 8 July 2014, at the age of 54.

References

1959 births
2014 deaths
Members of the National Council of Provinces
Women members of the National Council of Provinces
African National Congress politicians
South African women's rights activists
South African human rights activists